James Hill Dickson (6 August 1863 – 5 July 1938) was a unionist politician in Northern Ireland.

Dickson was a landowner and served as a county councillor for the Ulster Unionist Party.  He was elected to the first Senate of Northern Ireland, and served until 1938. He was also a JP in the 20s

He was a prominent Down agriculturist, serving in the Country Down Committee of Agriculture, and a committee member of Listooder Ploughing Society from c. 1926 to c. 1936.

References

External links
 

1863 births
1938 deaths
Councillors in Northern Ireland
Members of the Senate of Northern Ireland 1921–1925
Members of the Senate of Northern Ireland 1925–1929
Members of the Senate of Northern Ireland 1929–1933
Members of the Senate of Northern Ireland 1933–1937
Members of the Senate of Northern Ireland 1937–1941
Ulster Unionist Party members of the Senate of Northern Ireland